Concord International Centre is a supertall skyscraper completed in Chongqing, China. Construction started in 2012 and is expected to be completed in 2017.

See also
List of tallest buildings in Chongqing

References

Buildings and structures under construction in China
Skyscraper office buildings in Chongqing
Skyscraper hotels in Chongqing
Retail buildings in China
Skyscrapers in Chongqing